Matui (also Romanized as Matū’ī) is a village in Howmeh-ye Gharbi Rural District, in the Central District of Ramhormoz County, Khuzestan Province, Iran. At the 2006 census, its population was 172, in 37 families.

References 

Populated places in Ramhormoz County